Pil (also Romanized as Pīl; also known as Pel) is a village in Owzrud Rural District, Baladeh District, Nur County, Mazandaran Province, Iran. In 2006, its population was 53 people in 23 families.

References 

Populated places in Nur County